William Hall (7 April 1878 – date of death unknown) was an English cricketer who made two appearances in first-class cricket in 1905. He was a right-handed batsman and right-arm fast bowler.

Hall's two appearances for Warwickshire in first-class came against Oxford University at Oxford, and the touring Australians at Edgbaston. He scored a total of 11 runs in his two matches, and went wicketless across both matches.

References

External links
William Hall at ESPNcricinfo
William Hall at CricketArchive

1878 births
People from Bedworth
English cricketers
Warwickshire cricketers
Year of death missing